Special Services was the entertainment branch of the American military. The unit was created on 22 July 1940 by the War Department as part of the Army Service Forces. Special Services not only used its own specially trained and talented troops but also would often engage local performers.  Among its activities were staging plays and stage acts, holding concerts, filming documentaries, and providing recreational opportunities for servicemen.

Special Services were one of the few U.S. Army units to be racially integrated during World War II. Special Services opened their first Recreational Officer school at Fort Meade Maryland on 1 April 1942.

Within the United States Marine Corps, the Special Services Division was the forerunner of today's Special Services Branch. It was formed on 1 March 1943, to provide morale maintaining recreational and informational services to Marine Corps personnel. As of at least 2004, the Special Services Branch was still active within the USMC.

Roles
Roles within the Special Services (defined as Military Occupational Specialties) included that of Entertainment Specialist (03B), Physical Activities Specialist (03C), Crafts Specialist (03D), and Recreation Service Senior Sergeant (03Z).

Notable Special Service members
Some notable figures who served in the Special Services include actors Burt Lancaster, Mickey Rooney, and Sammy Davis, Jr.; film director Anatole Litvak, bandleader Glenn Miller, tenor Mario Lanza, folk singer Peter Seeger, and baseball slugger Hank Greenberg.

Expanded (partial) list

Ian Abercrombie
Philip Ahn
Irwin Allen
Keith Andes
Desi Arnaz
Ed Asner
Arnold M. Auerbach
Albert Ayler
Burt Bacharach
Harry Bellaver
Ken Berry
James Best
Joey Bishop
Bobby Breen
William Browning
Don Budge
Red Buttons
Sid Caesar (USCG)
Al Checco
Dabney Coleman
Broderick Crawford
Bill Daily
Vic Damone
Philip D'Antoni
Sammy Davis Jr.
Bill Dickey
Bob Dishy
Melvyn Douglas
Ruby Jane Douglas
Andrew Duggan
Clint Eastwood
Lee Elder
Gene Evans
Maurice Evans
Bob Fosse
Dan Frazer
Phil Gersh
Johnny Gilbert
Frank Gorshin
Carl Gottlieb
Hank Greenberg
Larry Hagman
Peter Lind Hayes
Buck Henry
Nat Hiken
Sterling Holloway
James Hong
Rance Howard
Jim Hutton
Jules Irving
Burl Ives
David Janssen
Werner Klemperer
Richard Kline
Don Knotts
Burt Lancaster
Mario Lanza
José Limón
Anatole Litvak
Jerry Livingston
Frank Loesser
Joshua Logan
Joe Louis
Allen Ludden
Mako
Karl Malden
Ralph Manza
Johnny Marks
Tony Martin
Ron Masak
Jody McCrea
Don Messick
Glenn Miller
Roger Miller
Martin Milner
Rudy Ray Moore
Howard Morris
Jules Munshin
Robert Nichols
Leonard Nimoy
Alex North
Donald O'Connor
Jack Paar
Arthur Penn
Nehemiah Persoff
Paul Picerni
Lloyd Price
Carl Reiner
Bobby Riggs
Phil Rizzuto
Sugar Ray Robinson
Mickey Rooney
Mitch Ryan 
Lenny Schultz
Pete Seeger
Hal Smith
Rip Taylor
Dick Van Dyke
Jerry Van Dyke
Chick Vennera
Fredd Wayne
Hy Zaret

Notes

Further reading
 Baird, Nancy Disher. "'To Lend You My Eyes...': The World War II Letters of Special Services Officer Harry Jackson." Register of the Kentucky Historical Society 88.3 (1990): 287–317, a primary source online
 Cooke, James J.  Chewing Gum, Candy Bars, and Beer: The Army PX in World War II (2009). 
 Cooke, James J. American Girls, Beer, and Glenn Miller: GI Morale in World War II (U of Missouri Press, 2012). 
 Kane, Liam. "Paving the Way to a 'Good Understanding': Recreation and Australian-American Army Cooperation in the South West Pacific Area, 1941–1945." Australasian Journal of American Studies 37.2 (2018) pp 27–52.
 Rorke, Margaret Ann. "Music and the wounded of World War II." Journal of Music Therapy 33.3 (1996): 189–207.

Branches of the United States Army
Military units and formations established in 1940
Entertainment organizations